The 2017–18 season was Huddersfield Town's 109th year in existence and first season in the Premier League following promotion through the 2017 Championship play-off Final. The club also competed in the FA Cup and EFL Cup.

The season covered the period from 1 July 2017 to 30 June 2018.

Transfers

Transfers in

Loans in

Transfers out

Loans out

First team

Last updated on 31 January 2018

Squad statistics

Appearances and goals
As 18:20, 13 May 2018 (UTC)

|-
!colspan="14"|Players who left during the season

|}

Cards

Awards

Huddersfield Town Blue & White Foundation Player of the Month Award

Awarded monthly to the player that was chosen by members of the Blue & White Foundation voting on htafc.com

Pre-season

Friendlies
As of 14 July 2017, Huddersfield Town have announced six pre-season friendlies against Bury, Accrington Stanley, Barnsley, VfB Stuttgart, Torino, SV Sandhausen and Udinese.

Competitions

Overview

Premier League

League table

Results summary

Results by matchday

Matches
On 14 June 2017, the Premier League fixtures were announced.

FA Cup
In the FA Cup, Huddersfield Town entered the competition in the third round and were drawn away to Bolton Wanderers.

EFL Cup

Huddersfield Town were drawn at home to Rotherham United as they entered into the second round of the competition. The Terriers were drawn away in the third round, against Crystal Palace.

References

Huddersfield Town
Huddersfield Town A.F.C. seasons